The Erlang Public License is a computer software license, which was applied to some older Erlang programming language source code. It is a derivative work of the Mozilla Public License, containing terms which differ from MPL, mainly in terms of jurisdiction. The license was constructed in accordance with the laws of Sweden.

Change of Apache License 2.0 
On June 12, 2015, Ericsson announced at the Erlang User Conference 2015 that starting with the subsequent major release, Erlang/OTP 18.0, Erlang/OTP source code would be released under terms of the Apache License 2.0.

References

External links
Text of the Erlang Public License
Erlang Public License explained

Software licenses